Horatio Walpole may refer to:

Horatio Walpole (died 1717) (1663–1717), MP for Castle Rising
Horatio Walpole, 1st Baron Walpole of Wolterton (1678–1757)
Horace Walpole, 4th Earl of Orford (1717–1797), author of The Castle of Otranto (1764)
Horatio Walpole, 1st Earl of Orford (1723–1809)
Horatio Walpole, 2nd Earl of Orford (1752–1822)
Horatio Walpole, 3rd Earl of Orford (1783–1858)
Horatio Walpole, 4th Earl of Orford (second creation) (1813–1894)